José Maria de Mascarenhas Relvas de Campos (Golegã, Golegã, 5 March 1858 – Alpiarça, Casa dos Patudos, 31 October 1929; , was a Portuguese politician and 70th Prime Minister of Portugal.

Personal life 
Jose was married to Eugénia de Loureiro Queirós Couto Leitão. He had three children: Carlos, João and Maria Luísa.

Political career
An historic republican, he proclaimed the republic from the balcony of the Municipal Chamber of Lisbon, on 5 October 1910. He was the second Minister of Finance during the provisional government led by Teófilo Braga, from 12 October 1910 to 3 September 1911.

After that, he served as ambassador of Portugal in Madrid, from 1911 to 1914. He was President of the Ministry (103rd Prime Minister), from 27 January to 30 March 1919, in one of the many short-lived governments of the Portuguese First Republic. His house in Alpiarça is now a museum, the Casa dos Patudos, where his art collection is exhibited.

References

1858 births
1929 deaths
People from Golegã
People from Alpiarça
Portuguese Republican Party politicians
Democratic Party (Portugal) politicians
Prime Ministers of Portugal
Finance ministers of Portugal
19th-century Portuguese people
Ambassadors of Portugal to Spain
Portuguese revolutionaries